The Africa International Film Festival (AFRIFF) is an annual film festival that takes place in Nigeria. It was founded in 2010 with its Inaugural edition in Port Harcourt, Rivers State, Nigeria. AFRIFF was founded by Chioma Ude a passionate film buff and entrepreneur, The event normally spans through a week and it includes award shows and film training classes. Keith Shiri, the founder/director of Africa at the Pictures is the artistic director of the festival. AFRIFF gives out honors in categories such Feature, Documentary, Short, Animation, and Students Short, as well as awards and prizes for Directing, Acting, and Screenplay. There are additional special awards for Audience Choice and an Outstanding Film Jury Award.

Africa International Film Festival events

2010 Africa International Film Festival
The 2010 Africa International Film Festival was held in Port Harcourt from 1 December 2010 to 5 December 2010. The festival followed after its first official announcement at the 6th Africa Movie Academy Awards. The 5 day event featured several activities that included workshop, screenings, film premiere, awards night & a fashion show. The event featured performances from  P-Square and Duncan Mighty. The theme for the year was "Africa Unites". Eligible submissions must have been produced after 1 January 2009 and submitted before 31 August 2010.

Award Winners

2011 Africa International Film Festival
The 2011 Africa International Film Festival took place from 30 November 2011 to 3 December 2011 in Lagos. The event was sponsored by Arik Air and submissions were open from March 30 to July 30, 2011. Leila Djansi's Ties That Bind opened the ceremony with its premiere at Genesis Deluxe Cinemas. The event was anchored by Rita Dominic and IK Osakioduwa. Lynn Whitfield was the ambassador of the festival. P-Square performed at the Oriental Hotel on the final day of the event.

Award Winners

2013 Africa International Film Festival
The 2013 Africa International Film Festival was held from 10 November to 17 November 2013 at Tinapa, Cross River. The event was hosted by Darey Art Alade and TV personality, Michelle Dede. The event was sponsored by UBA. South African film Of Good Report won the Best Feature Film.

Award Winners

2014 Africa International Film Festival
The 2014 Africa International Film Festival was held from 9 November 2014 to 16 November 2014 at Tinapa, Cross River.

Award Winners

2015 Africa International Film Festival

Awards Winners

2016 Africa International Film Festival
The 2016 AFRIFF Globe Awards held on Saturday, 19 November 2016, at Eko Hotel and Suites, Victoria Island, Lagos, Nigeria.

Awards winners
Alero OKORODUS

2017 Africa International Film Festival
AFRIFF 2017 featured the following; Panel sessions, screenings, school children segment and various trainings.

Awards Winners

2018 Africa International Film Festival 
The 8th annual AFRIFF was held from 11 to 17 November 2018 at Twin Waters Entertainment Center in Lagos, Nigeria.

Awards Winners

2019 Africa International Film Festival 
The 9th annual AFRIFF was held from November 10 to 16, 2019 at Filmhouse Cinemas in Landmark, Retail Village, Lagos, Nigeria. It was organized in partnership with the US Consulate, Access Bank and Lagos State. The 2019 AFRIFF was focused on the ''SHEROES" that is the Female Film Makers.

Awards Winners

2021 Africa International Film Festival 
The 10th annual AFRIFF was held from 7 to 13 November 2021 at Terra Kulture, Victoria Island, Lagos, Nigeria. It was the first edition after a one-year hiatus caused by the COVID-19 pandemic.

Awards Winners

References

External links
Official Website
AFRIFF on Facebook
AFRIFF on Twitter

Entertainment events in Nigeria
Nigerian film awards
Film festivals in Nigeria
Recurring events established in 2010
2010 establishments in Nigeria